Gramme-Vippach is a Verwaltungsgemeinschaft ("collective municipality") in the district of Sömmerda, Thuringia, Germany. The seat of the Verwaltungsgemeinschaft is in Schloßvippach. It was formed on 31 December 2019 by the merger of the former Verwaltungsgemeinschaften An der Marke and Gramme-Aue.

The Verwaltungsgemeinschaft Gramme-Vippach consists of the following municipalities:

Alperstedt
Eckstedt
Großmölsen
Großrudestedt
Kleinmölsen
Markvippach
Nöda
Ollendorf
Schloßvippach
Sprötau
Udestedt
Vogelsberg

References

Verwaltungsgemeinschaften in Thuringia